Agriocnemis gratiosa is a species of damselfly in the family Coenagrionidae. It is found in Botswana, the Democratic Republic of the Congo, Kenya, Madagascar, Malawi, Mozambique, Namibia, South Africa, Sudan, Tanzania, Uganda, Zambia, and possibly Burundi.

References

Coenagrionidae
Insects described in 1891
Taxonomy articles created by Polbot